Yao Wenlong (born 14 November 1970) is a Singapore based Malaysian actor.

Career
Yao entered the local television scene after winning the Star Search 1993 (Male category) organised by then Singapore Broadcasting Corporation (now MediaCorp). Within a year, he won the Most Popular Newcomer award in Star Awards 1994 and the Best Supporting Actor award in Star Awards 2001 for his role as a sissy in drama Looking for Stars.

Besides television dramas, he appeared in the popular sitcom, My Genie alongside Fiona Xie and Huang Yiliang. Yao starred in the 80 episode long Kinship series in 2007, where he collaborated with Jesseca Liu, Elvin Ng, Ann Kok, Cynthia Koh and Xiang Yun. In 2008, he played butcher Liu Yidao in the highly acclaimed serial The Little Nyonya, garnering him yet another Best Supporting Actor nomination.

Personal life 
Yao is married to Jenny Tsai and has a son and daughter.

Filmography

Film

Television

Compilation album

Awards and nominations

References

External links
Profile on xinmsn

Living people
Singaporean male television actors
Malaysian people of Hokkien descent
Malaysian people of Chinese descent
1970 births
People from Johor